Atherton station is a former Caltrain station in Atherton, California. The station had one side platform and one island platform serving the two tracks of the Peninsula Subdivision, with a concrete and wooden shelter on the west side of the tracks. The station opened by the Southern Pacific Railroad in 1866 as Fair Oaks and was renamed Atherton in 1912. Caltrain cut weekday service to the station in 2005 due to low ridership and a hold-out rule that prohibited two trains from being at the station simultaneously. Weekend service continued until December 2020.

History

The San Francisco and San Jose Railroad opened from San Francisco to Mayfield in 1863, and to San Jose the next year. A flag stop at Fair Oaks was in use by 1866. The Southern Pacific Railroad (SP) took over the line in 1870. The station was renamed Atherton after Faxon Atherton in 1912, eleven years prior to the incorporation of the town under that name.

The SP replaced the original wooden shelter with a larger shelter in 1913. The new structure had a terra cotta tile roof with redwood framing supported by Tuscan concrete columns. Three sides were enclosed by glass in 1916, and the fourth by 1939. Glass-walled extensions were added in 1954, with the track-facing side of the original shelter again open.

Atherton was served by the Del Monte until 1971; SP Peninsula Commute service was taken over by Caltrain in the 1980s. The station was surveyed in 1983 for potential inclusion on the National Register of Historic Places; it was ruled ineligible due to the 1954 modifications. The shelter was rebuilt in 1990; all materials except the concrete columns were replaced. The structure was briefly painted in SP yellow, but quickly repainted in a muted beige due to resident complaints. The portion of the station platform north of the Fair Oaks Lane grade crossing was abandoned at that time so that stopped trains would not block the crossing. The building was damaged by a fire in the 1990s and another in April 2007.

Weekday service to Atherton station was discontinued in 2005, with Caltrain citing low ridership, operational challenges, and the need to save money due to a projected budget shortfall. In February 2005, just before service was discontinued, the station saw less than 122 passenger boardings per day. Due to the older narrow center platform configuration, the station was subject to a hold-out rule, preventing other trains from stopping or passing through when a train was serving the station. Caltrain offered a shuttle bus from Atherton station to Redwood City station; it was discontinued on July 1, 2007, due to low ridership.

In July 2017, Caltrain committed to restoring weekday service once electrification of the corridor had been completed. However, on January 8, 2020, Caltrain proposed permanently closing the station. The city of Atherton tentatively endorsed the proposal on January 15. The station would have required a $30 million renovation to build side platforms to allow the hold out rule to be removed. On November 5, the city of Atherton and the Caltrain Board came to an agreement to close the station. The final day of service to Atherton station was Sunday, December 13, 2020; a schedule change on December 14 eliminated service to Atherton effective the weekend of December 19–20. Caltrain will remove the station's center boarding platform, install a fence along the right-of-way, and install new four-quadrant crossing gates at Watkins Avenue.

References

External links

Caltrain: Atherton Station, Proposed Closure of Atherton Caltrain Station

Former Caltrain stations
Caltrain stations in San Mateo County, California
Former Southern Pacific Railroad stations in California
Railway stations in the United States opened in 1866
Railway stations closed in 2020